Mesalina martini, also known as Martin's desert racer, is a species of sand-dwelling lizard in the family Lacertidae. It occurs in Yemen, Egypt, Sudan, Eritrea, Ethiopia, and Somalia.

References

martini
Reptiles described in 1897
Taxa named by George Albert Boulenger